Maryada (meaning decorum, conduct) is a 1971 Indian Hindi-language tragedy film directed by Arabind Sen. The film stars Rajesh Khanna, Raaj Kumar and Mala Sinha. This film is counted among the 17 consecutive hit films of Rajesh Khanna between 1969 and 1971, by adding the two-hero films Marayada and Andaz to the 15 consecutive solo hits he gave from 1969 to 1971.

Plot
Lalita (Mala Sinha) lives with her widowed mother (Dulari) in a small village in India. One day while traveling by road, she is stranded, and a young man named Raja Babu (Rajesh Khanna) comes to her assistance. Both fall in love with each other. When she informs her mother about her love for Raja, she is met with strong opposition, as her mother knows that Raja Babu is already married and has a son. She also reminds Lalita about her marriage with Diwan (Abhi Bhattacharya). When Lalita meets with Raja, he admits to her that he is not Raja but his real name is Rajan Ram Bahadur, but refuses to divulge any other information to her. She decides that she will have nothing to do with him. The mystery deepens when Pran Bahadur (Pran), the step-brother of Raja Babu returns and wants to confront the young man who has taken over Raja's identity, with results that will change the lives of everyone around them forever.

Cast
 Mala Sinha as Laxmi / Lalita
 Raaj Kumar as Raja Babu
 Rajesh Khanna as Raja Babu / Rajan Ram Bahadur
 Pran as Pran Bahadur, Raja's step-brother
 Rajendra Nath		
 Bipin Gupta as Ram Bahadur, Rajan Bahadur's father		
 Asit Sen as Dhondumal
 Jankidas as Seth Kirodimal	
 Abhi Bhattacharya as Diwan (Lalita's husband)
 Dulari as Lalita's mom
 Helen as item number Dil ka lena dena humne..

Soundtrack
The film score is composed by the musical duo Kalyanji–Anandji. The lyrics were written by Anand Bakshi.

Track listing

References

External links
 

1971 films
1970s Hindi-language films
Films scored by Kalyanji Anandji
1971 drama films
Indian family films
Indian drama films
Hindi-language drama films